Sir James Clerke (born c. 1584) was an English lawyer and politician who sat in the House of Commons between 1624 and 1626.

Clerke was of  Herefordshire. He matriculated at Brasenose College, Oxford on 19 April 1599, aged 15 and was possibly awarded BA from Hart Hall, Oxford. He was called to the bar at Inner Temple in 1610. In 1624, he was elected Member of Parliament for Hereford and was re-elected in 1625 and 1626.

References

1580s births
Year of death missing
People from Hereford
English MPs 1624–1625
English MPs 1625
English MPs 1626